Yeşilbağ can refer to:

 Yeşilbağ, Çınar
 Yeşilbağ, Manavgat